Run Barbi Run is a 1995 Filipino comedy film directed by Tony Y. Reyes. The film stars the Eraserheads and Maricel Laxa, with Joey de Leon reprising his role as the titular character. It is third installment of the Barbi trilogy, which started with Barbi: Maid in the Philippines in 1989 and the political satire comedy Barbi for President (First Lady na Rin) in 1991.

Story
Bartolome del Rosario is a Shakey's pizza delivery boy who witnesses the massacre of the Black Scorpion Gang committed by a group of henchmen while delivering pizza at night.  As a result, he was indefinitely suspended from his job and had to decide whether to turn state witness or hide forever.  Ultimately, he decides to turn himself over to the authorities after his grandmother and mother appeared in his dream.  Unknown to him however, he is already on the death list of the henchmen's boss Gardo who was not pleased with his revelations.  A conflict with the authorities over a supposed filmization of the massacre witnessed by Bartolome almost cost him his life after Gardo was able to find his whereabouts.  Thus, he had to run again and hide.  He later found himself in a bar that features gay impersonators and rock bands.  Seeing an opportunity to escape from being hounded by different personalities involved in the investigation of the crime he witnessed, he disguised himself as Barbi, the gay impersonator of Barbra Streisand.

As Barbi, he was able to enjoy the life as an impersonator/DJ in the bar and was able to make friends with the bar's in-house band, the Eraserheads. He even got to help save the band from music pirates who were copying the band's songs. But when he crossed paths with a policewoman named Victoria "Toyang" Fernandez, he had to reveal his true identity as the star witness of the crime that he saw. As a result, he joined forces with Toyang and the Eraserheads to finally pin down the crime boss Gardo who wants him dead.

Cast
Joey de Leon as Bartolome "Barbi" del Rosario
Maricel Laxa as Victoria "Toyang" Fernandez
Eraserheads as themselves
Roldan Aquino as Gardo (crime boss)
Subas Herrero as Atty. Ramon Lazaro 
Nanette Inventor as Flor
Richard Merck as Junior
Noel Trinidad as Maj. Velarde
Lou Veloso as Mr. Gloria, Shakey's supervisor 
Rolando Tinio as Mr. Tengko
Gary Lising as Alex
Archie Adamos as Direk Carlito Carlos
Inday Garutay as himself
Allan K. as himself/a female impersonator
Vangie Labalan as Flora
Mely Tagasa as Decia
Winnie Cordero as Corder
Amy Coronel
Prospero Luna
Robert Talby as Frankie
Danny Labra as Versosa
Nonong de Andres as Chris
Rene Hawkins as Magsanoc
Ernie Forte as Abarrientos
Jun Encarnacion as a female impersonator
Giovanni Calvo as himself

Original soundtrack
"Run Barbi Run" by Eraserheads
"With A Smile" by Eraserheads
"Magasin" by Eraserheads
"Dreamlover" by Mariah Carey
"I'll Never Love This Way Again" by Dionne Warwick
"This Is My Live (La Vida)" by Shirley Bassey

Production notes
Some of the actors that co-starred with Joey de Leon in the second Barbi film appear in Run Barbi Run in different roles. Noel Trinidad (who previously played the "presidentiable" Miguel San Pedro), Mely Tagasa (as the incumbent president's wife), Nanette Inventor (Madam "Auring" the fortune teller) and Lou Veloso (as the deranged presidentiable Domeng).

Release
Released in 1995, Run Barbi Run performed poorly at the box office.

References

External links

1995 films
GMA Pictures films
Filipino-language films
1990s Tagalog-language films
Films directed by Tony Y. Reyes
1995 comedy films
Philippine comedy films
Films about musical groups
1990s crime comedy films
Rock music films
Video albums by Filipino artists
Copyright infringement
Philippine LGBT-related films
Cross-dressing in film
1995 LGBT-related films
Drag (clothing)-related films
LGBT-related comedy films